The 31st Assembly District of Wisconsin is one of 99 districts in the Wisconsin State Assembly. Located in southern Wisconsin, the district comprises southeast Rock County and most of the northern half of Walworth County.  It includes the city of Elkhorn, the southern half of the city of Whitewater, and parts of eastern Beloit, as well as the villages of Clinton and Darien.  It includes the southern half of the University of Wisconsin–Whitewater campus and the Alpine Valley Resort.  The district is represented by Republican Ellen Schutt, since January 2023. 

The 31st Assembly district is located within Wisconsin's 11th Senate district, along with the 32nd and 33rd Assembly districts.

List of past representatives

References 

Wisconsin State Assembly districts
Rock County, Wisconsin
Walworth County, Wisconsin